Anna Maria Klechniowska (b. 15 April 1888; d. 28 Aug 1973) was a Polish music educator and composer. She was born in Borowka, Ukraine, and studied at the Warsaw and Lemberg (Lviv) Conservatories, and then in Leipzig and Paris. She graduated from the Vienna Academy in 1917, after studying with Lech Jaczynowski, Gustaw Roguski, Mieczyslaw Soltys, Joseph Pembauer, Stanisław Niewiadomski, Stephan Krehl, Klara Czop-Umlauf, Franz Schmidt and Nadia Boulanger. After completing her studies, she worked as a teacher and arts administrator. She died in Warsaw.

Works
Klechniowska was known for piano works for young children and vocal compositions. Selected works include:
A Wedding Overture, for orchestra (1955)
The Seasons of the Year, symphonic suite (1953)
The Royal Castle in Cracow, symphonic poem
Phantasma, ballet-pantomime in 6 scenes, (1964)

References

1888 births
1973 deaths
20th-century classical composers
Polish classical composers
Polish music educators
Women classical composers
Women music educators
20th-century women composers
Polish women composers